"When You Dance I Can Really Love" is the ninth track on Neil Young's 1970 album After the Gold Rush. It was written by Young.

Background
The official Neil Young website gives the title as "When You Dance I Can Really Love"; however, the CD release (US catalogue number 2283-2, Europe 7599-27243-2) has the title misprinted as "When You Dance You Can Really Love." The correct title appears on other albums, such as Live Rust. It also appears in Young's handwritten lyrics included with some copies of the album.

Chart performance
It was released as a single in the U.S. in 1971, reaching #93 on the Hot 100, Billboard charts. It was also released as a single in Japan.

References

Songs about dancing
Neil Young songs
1970 songs
1971 singles
Songs written by Neil Young
Song recordings produced by David Briggs (record producer)
Reprise Records singles
Song recordings produced by Neil Young